John Ypres Oakes (29 March 1916 – 4 July 1997) was an English cricketer active from 1937 to 1969 who played for Sussex. He was born in Horsham and died in Hexham. He appeared in 128 first-class matches as a righthanded batsman who bowled off breaks (OB). He scored 4,410 runs with a highest score of 151, one of two centuries, and took 166 wickets with a best performance of seven for 64. Oakes had a long association with club cricket and became a groundsman after he retired as a player, serving for many years at Formica Ltd in Tynemouth, as well as the broader De La Rue group, where Robin Marlar also made his mark.. He was the younger brother of Charles Oakes.

Notes

1916 births
1997 deaths
English cricketers
Sussex cricketers
Northumberland cricketers